Gunpowder, Treason & Plot is a 2004 BBC miniseries based upon the lives of Mary, Queen of Scots and her son James VI of Scotland. Written by Jimmy McGovern, the series tells the story behind the Gunpowder Plot in two parts, each centred on one of the respective monarchs. The first film dramatizes the relationship between Mary (Clémence Poésy) and her third husband, James Hepburn, 4th Earl of Bothwell (Kevin McKidd). Scottish actor Robert Carlyle stars as James VI in the second part, which concentrates on the Gunpowder Plot, planned by Guy Fawkes, to blow up the Houses of Parliament in order to rid the nation of a Protestant monarch.

Plot
Episode 1 opens with Mary, Queen of Scots, who is in exile in France returning to Scotland in 1561. Mary's second husband is Lord Darnley who participates in the extrajudicial killing of David Rizzio. Mary's son, James I, was sired by Darnley. Mary's final husband is long-time paramour Bothwell.

The opening scene of Episode 2 is in Scotland in 1587 showing James I saying, "I have every right to hate you [his mother Mary]."

Cast
 Clémence Poésy as Mary, Queen of Scots
 Iona Ruxandra Bratosin as Young Mary
 Carmen Ungureanu as Mary of Guise
 Steven Duffy as Lord James, half-brother of Mary, Queen of Scots
 Kevin McKidd as Bothwell
 Tadeusz Pasternak as David Rizzio
 Maria Popistașu as Lady Marie
 Catherine McCormack as Queen Elizabeth I
 Gary Lewis as John Knox
 Paul Nicholls as Lord Darnley
 Robert Carlyle as King James I
 Sira Stampe as Anne of Denmark
 Tim McInnerny as Cecil
 Emilia Fox as Lady Margaret
 Michael Fassbender as Guy Fawkes
 Richard Coyle as Robert Catesby
 Richard Harrington as Thomas Percy in episode 2
 Sam Troughton as Thomas Winter in episode 2

Production
Directed by Gillies MacKinnon, it was filmed in Romania with a Scottish crew.  McGovern had previously covered the Plot in the one-hour play Traitors for BBC2's Screenplay strand, transmitted on 5 November 1990.

See also
Gunpowder (TV series) – another BBC production about the Plot, starring Kit Harrington.

References

External links
 Gunpowder, Treason & Plot BBC Archived from the original
 Gunpowder, Treason & Plot at the Internet Movie Database

2004 British television series debuts
2004 British television series endings
2000s British drama television series
BBC television royalty dramas
BBC television dramas
2000s British television miniseries
Gunpowder Plot
English-language television shows
Cultural depictions of Elizabeth I
Cultural depictions of Mary, Queen of Scots
Cultural depictions of Guy Fawkes
Cultural depictions of James VI and I
Films directed by Gillies MacKinnon